Althen-des-Paluds (Provençal: Lei Palús or Alten) is a commune in the Vaucluse department in the Provence-Alpes-Côte d'Azur region in southeastern France.

The commune is crossed by the river Sorgue.

Name of the city

The name of Althen-des-Paluds is a homage to Jean Althen.

Climate
The climate is of Mediterranean type and is characterized by rather hot and dry summers and soft winters.

The average temperatures oscillate between 0 and 30° according to the season. The record of temperature since the existence of the INRA' station is of 40,5 °C at the time of the European heat wave of 2003 on August 5 and -12,8 °C on January 5, 1985. The weather statements are done with Agroparc office of Avignon.

Nearby Cities
Monteux  Bédarrides  Entraigues-sur-la-Sorgue  Velleron  Le Thor  Saint-Saturnin-lès-Avignon

International relations

Althen-des-Paluds is twinned with Monte Carlo, Monaco.

Gallery

See also
Communes of the Vaucluse department

References

Communes of Vaucluse